Under the Smoky Roof is a 2017 Iranian drama film written and directed by Pouran Derakhshandeh.

Plot 
Shirin, who is gradually having problems in family life with her child and her husband, Looking to find a way to connect with them, which fails and reaches a crisis. Her re-attempt to get out of this crisis presents her with a new challenge.

Cast 
 Farhad Aslani

 Merila Zarei
 Behnoosh Tabatabaei
 Azita Hajian
 Rasoul Najafian
 Laleh Marzban
 Abolfazl Miri
 Shahram Haghighat Doost
 Nafiseh Roshan
 Hesam Navab Safavi
 Fariba Motekhases
 Hadi Marzban
 Maryam Boubani
 Hushang Tavakoli

References 
 Under the Smoky Roof on Tasnim News

External links

2017 films
2010s Persian-language films
Iranian drama films
2017 drama films